Following is a list of notable people who were either born in the American state of Idaho or lived there for a substantial amount of time.

A

William Agee – business executive, Boise
Joseph Albertson – Albertson's grocery store chain, Caldwell
Cecil D. Andrus – former United States Secretary of the Interior and Governor of Idaho, Orofino
James Jesus Angleton – former chief of counter-intelligence, Central Intelligence Agency, Boise
Kristin Armstrong – Olympic gold medal cyclist (2008 and 2012), Boise
Don Aslett – entrepreneur and author, Twin Falls

B

Brandon Bair – NFL defensive end, Rexburg
Matthew Barney – filmmaker and artist, Boise
Terrel Howard Bell – former United States Secretary of Education, Lava Hot Springs
Andy Benoit – NFL writer for Sports Illustrated, Boise
Ezra Taft Benson – LDS Church President and United States Secretary of Agriculture, Whitney
Bowe Bergdahl – U.S. Army soldier charged with desertion, Sun Valley
Billie Bird – actress and comedian, Pocatello
Ronee Blakley – actress and singer, Caldwell
William E. Borah – United States Senator, Boise
Gutzon Borglum – Mount Rushmore sculptor, St. Charles
Gregory "Pappy" Boyington – WWII Marine fighter ace, Medal of Honor recipient, Coeur d'Alene
Carol Ryrie Brink – author, Moscow
Phyllis Brooks – actress and model, Boise
Edgar Rice Burroughs – creator and author of the Tarzan series, Parma
MaryJane Butters – organic farmer, author, environmental activist, food manufacturer, and publisher, Moscow

C

J. D. Cannon – actor, Salmon
Annetta R. Chipp – president, South Idaho Woman's Christian Temperance Union
Kerry Christensen – yodeler, Grace
Michael Christianson – football coach, commentator, Kuna
Forrester Church – Unitarian Universalist minister, Boise
Frank Church – United States Senator, Boise
Boyd Coddington – car customizer, Rupert
Georgia Coleman – diver, gold medalist at 1932 Olympics, St. Maries
Clancy Cooper – actor, Boise
Genevieve Cortese – actress, Supernatural, Wildfire, Sun Valley
Larry Craig – United States Senator, on board of directors of  National Rifle Association, Midvale
Ella D. Crawford – president, South Idaho Woman's Christian Temperance Union
Lewis Croft – actor with dwarfism, Shelley
Chris Crutcher – writer and family therapist, Cascade
Dan Cummins – comedian, Riggins

D

Ken Dayley – Major League pitcher, Jerome
Raquel Devine – porn actress, Meridian
Gloria Dickson – actress, Pocatello
Lillian Disney – wife of Walt Disney, Spalding
Lou Dobbs – television news anchor, Rupert
Claire Du Brey – actress, Bonners Ferry
Fred Dubois – United States Senator, Blackfoot
Patty Duke – actress, Coeur d'Alene

E

Logan Emory – MLS defender, Boise 
Shirley Englehorn – professional golfer, Caldwell

F

Bill Fagerbakke – actor, Rupert
Philo Farnsworth – inventor of television, Rigby
A. J. Feeley – NFL quarterback, Caldwell
W. Mark Felt – FBI official known as Deep Throat, Twin Falls
Stephen Fife – MLB pitcher, Boise
Bernie Fisher – US Air Force Vietnam War Medal of Honor recipient, Kuna
Vardis Fisher – author, Hagerman
Mary Hallock Foote – author, Boise
John Foreman – film producer, Idaho Falls
John Friesz – NFL quarterback, Coeur d'Alene
Bryan Fuller – screenwriter, television producer, Lewiston
Christina Fulton – actress, Boise

G

Jeremy Gable – playwright, Post Falls
Adam Blue Galli – one of the "Preppie Bandits"
Mike Garman – MLB pitcher, Caldwell
Julie Gibson – actress, Lewiston
Jordan Gross – NFL offensive tackle, Fruitland

H

 Philip Habib – Middle East peace envoy of three presidents and Ambassador, Moscow
 Nick Hagadone – MLB pitcher, Sandpoint
Gregg Hale – musician and producer, Idaho Falls
Korey Hall – NFL fullback, Glenns Ferry
Kate Harrington – actress, Boise
Brad Harris – actor, stuntman, St. Anthony
Gene Harris – jazz musician, Boise
Dree Hemingway – fashion model, actress, Sun Valley
Ernest Hemingway – author, Ketchum
Margaux Hemingway – actress, Ketchum
Mariel Hemingway – actress, Ketchum
Christina Hendricks – actress, Twin Falls
Jared Hess – filmmaker, Preston
Josh Hill – NFL tight end, Blackfoot
Michael Hoffman – filmmaker, Payette
Merril Hoge – NFL running back and sportscaster, Pocatello
Chris Horn – NFL wide receiver, Notus
Doris Houck – actress, Wallace
James Hoyt – MLB pitcher, Boise
Howard W. Hunter – LDS Church President, Boise

J

Larry Jackson – MLB pitcher, state representative, Nampa
Sherry Jackson – actress, Wendell
Christian Jacobs – musician, television producer, voice actor, Rexburg
Johnny James –  MLB relief pitcher, Bonners Ferry
Bobby Jenks – MLB relief pitcher, Spirit Lake
Phil Johnson – pro basketball coach, Grace
Chief Joseph – Nez Perce leader

K

Harold Kelley – social psychologist, Boise
Dirk Kempthorne – former United States Secretary of the Interior, U.S. Senator and Governor of Idaho, Boise
George Kennedy – Academy Award-winning actor, Boise
Harmon Killebrew – Hall of Fame baseball player, Payette
Dirk Koetter – NFL head coach, Tampa Bay Buccaneers, Pocatello
Gus Kohntopp – pilot, Buhl
Mary Kornman –  child actress, Idaho Falls
Jerry Kramer – NFL offensive guard, Sandpoint
Paul Kruger – NFL linebacker, Rexburg

L

Rita La Roy – actress, Bonners Ferry
Vance Law – baseball player, Boise
Vernon Law – baseball player, Meridian
Mark Lindsay – musician, Caldwell, now Grangeville
Matt Lindstrom – baseball pitcher, Rexburg
Sean Paul Lockhart – actor, director, Lewiston
Jeanette Loff – actress and singer, Orofino
Larry Lujack – radio personality, started his career in Caldwell
Clarence Lung – actor, Boise

M

Doug Martsch – musician, Boise
Bonnie McCarroll – rodeo performer, Boise
Shea McClellin – NFL linebacker, Caldwell
Richard McKenna – author, Mountain Home
Patrick F. McManus – author, Sandpoint
Bob Mizer – photographer and filmmaker, Hailey
Rob Morris – NFL linebacker, Nampa
Randy Mueller – NFL executive, St. Maries

N

O

 Jack O'Connor – author, hunting and shooting sports editor of Outdoor Life, Lewiston
 Olive Osmond – matriarch of the Osmond singing family, Samaria
 Brock Osweiler – NFL quarterback for the Denver Broncos, Coeur d'Alene

P

Thom Pace – singer-songwriter, Boise
Sarah Palin – politician, Sandpoint
Matt Paradis – NFL center, Council
Cheryl Paris – actress, Burley
Aaron Paul – actor, Emmett
Kimberlee Peterson – actress, Boise
Cody Pickett – NFL quarterback, Caldwell
 Jay Pickett – actor, Caldwell
Jake Pitts – guitarist, rock band Black Veil Brides, Boise
Jake Plummer – NFL quarterback, Boise
Ezra Pound – poet, Hailey
Bridget Powers – erotic film actress, Boise

R

Martha Raddatz – reporter with ABC News, Idaho Falls
Ford Rainey – actor, Mountain Home
V. Lane Rawlins – president emeritus, Washington State University, southeast Idaho
Barbara Jane Reams – actress, Burley
Paul Revere – musician, Caldwell
Marjorie Reynolds – actress, Buhl
Luke Ridnour – NBA point guard, Coeur d'Alene
Doug Riesenberg – NFL offensive tackle, Moscow
Mike Riley – college football coach, Wallace
Josh Ritter – singer-songwriter, Moscow
Marilynne Robinson – winner of 2005 Pulitzer Prize for Fiction, Sandpoint
Ron Romanick – MLB pitcher and pitching coach, Burley
Scott Rozell – musician, Scatterbox, Moral Crux, Coeur d'Alene

S

Bill Salkeld – Major League Baseball catcher, Pocatello
Jason Schmidt – Major League Baseball pitcher, Lewiston
Ken Schrom – Major League Baseball pitcher and current minor league executive, Grangeville
Jake Scott – guard with Philadelphia Eagles, Lewiston
Larry Scott – IFBB professional bodybuilder, Blackfoot
Richard G. Scott – member of Quorum of the Twelve Aposles, of the LDS Church, The Church Of Jesus Christ Of Latter Day Saints. Pocatello
Jill Seaman – doctor and public health advocate, Moscow
Johnny Sequoyah – child actress, Boise
Jeremy Shada – actor, musician, singer, Boise
Zack Shada – actor, producer, director, Boise
Brandi Sherwood – Miss Teen USA 1989, and assumed title of Miss USA 1997, Idaho Falls
J. R. Simplot – industrialist, Declo
Nikki Sixx – musician, co-founder of Mötley Crüe, Jerome
Robert E. Smylie – former Governor of Idaho, Boise
Rosalie Sorrels – singer-songwriter, Boise County
Henry Spalding – missionary, Lapwai Valley
Beatrice Sparks – therapist, Mormon youth counselor, Custer County
Chaske Spencer – actor, lived in Kooskia, Lapwai and Lewiston
Frank Steunenberg – assassinated Governor of Idaho, Caldwell
Gary Stevens – Hall of Fame jockey, Caldwell
Jerramy Stevens – NFL tight end, Boise
Edward Stevenson – Oscar-winning costume designer, Pocatello
Curtis Stigers – musician and songwriter, Boise
Picabo Street – world and Olympic champion skier, Triumph
Kristine Sutherland – actress, Boise
Scott Syme – politician, Weiser

T

Renee Tenison – model and actress, Caldwell
Rosie Tenison – model and actress, Caldwell
Hugh Thornton – guard for the Indianapolis Colts, Boise
Ted Trueblood – outdoor writer, sportsman, and conservationist, Nampa
Glenn Tryon – actor, writer, director, Juliaetta
Lana Turner – actress, Wallace

U

 Brady Udall – author

V

 Leighton Vander Esch – NFL linebacker, Riggins
 Walter Varney – aviation industry pioneer, Boise

W

Wayne Walker – NFL linebacker, Boise
Mel Wasserman – founder of CEDU Family of Services, Bonner
Dick Wesson – movie and television announcer, Boise
Tara Westover – author, Clifton
Rumer Willis – actress, Hailey
Edwin P. Wilson – CIA officer, Nampa
Larry Wilson – NFL free safety, Rigby
Torrie Wilson – WWE wrestler, model, Boise
Jefferson Wood – illustrator, Boise
Robert S. Wood – leader in the Church of Jesus Christ of Latter-day Saints, Idaho Falls
Jonathan M. Woodward – actor, Moscow
Victor Wooten – Grammy Award-winning bass guitarist, Mountain Home

X-Z

La Monte Young – avant-garde artist, composer and musician, Bern
Norma Zimmer – singer with Lawrence Welk, Shoshone County

See also

 Lists of Americans
 Lists of politicians and government officials

 List of governors of Idaho
 List of justices of the Idaho Supreme Court
 List of mayors of Boise, Idaho
 List of speakers of the Idaho House of Representatives
 List of United States representatives from Idaho
 List of United States senators from Idaho

 Other lists of people from Idaho

 List of Brigham Young University–Idaho alumni
 List of University of Idaho people

References